The Mike Meyer Disfarmer Gravesite is a historic gravesite in the Heber Springs Cemetery, Heber Springs, Arkansas.  The grave is marked by a simple granite marker, bearing the legend "Mike Meyer Disfarmer /  1884–1959", with an egg-and-dart pattern in the bottom center between the dates, and a floral design above each of the dates.  It is the only known surviving place associated with Mike Disfarmer, a noted regional portrait photographer.  Disfarmer had his studio in Heber Springs, and photographed mainly local subjects.  His work was the subject of a major retrospective in New York City in 1976.

The site was listed on the National Register of Historic Places in 2009.

See also
 National Register of Historic Places listings in Cleburne County, Arkansas

References

Cemeteries on the National Register of Historic Places in Arkansas
1959 sculptures
Buildings and structures in Cleburne County, Arkansas
1959 establishments in Arkansas